Henry K. Holsman  (1866–1963) was an American architect and car manufacturer from Chicago, Illinois.

See also
Holsman Automobile Company

References

1866 births
1963 deaths
20th-century American architects
Artists from Chicago
19th-century American architects